The Film and Media Studies program (FMS), Tufts University was founded in 1982, and is affiliated with the Experimental College at Tufts University. The Film and Media Studies program used to be known as Communications and Media Studies (CMS). 
 
FMS is the largest interdisciplinary minor program at Tufts University, offering undergraduate major and minors in Film and Media Studies. Since awarding its first minor degrees to four students in 1997 as CMS, FMS has awarded minors to nearly 1,000 students.

In addition to its academic programs, FMS supports experiential student internships for academic credit in various media companies around the globe. FMS also sponsors several awards and events to honor excellence in the media industry, including The Edward R. Murrow Forum on Issues in Journalism, The Eliot-Pearson Awards for Excellence in Children’s Media, and the P.T. Barnum Awards for Excellence in Entertainment.

About FMS 
The curriculum encompasses narrative, documentary, and avant-garde modes in live action and animated images as well as sound and text-based platforms. In keeping with Tufts' liberal arts tradition, core courses in film and media analysis, history, theory, and production are supplemented by electives in a variety of academic departments and programs. FMS students are required to take three core courses during their undergraduate career. FMS also offers courses in television, journalism, advertising and social media. Alternatively, they may concentrate their electives in film studies, or in filmmaking or media practice. The internship program and the capstone requirement provide further opportunities for students to explore different areas of interest and pursue their own goals.

The FMS major and minor can be used as stepping stones for graduate studies/professional programs, and for career opportunities in film, television, advertising, public relations, journalism and digital media. Students have also gone on to work in health and environmental communication, as well as other fields in which critical thinking skills, a background in film and media, and extensive writing experience are required.

Major requirements 
The Film and Media Studies major requires the completion of twelve courses:  three mandatory core courses, seven or eight elective courses and either a two or one course capstone. Students may concentrate their electives in film studies, film and media production, or communications and media studies. Students must take courses from at least three different departments or programs in addition to FMS designated courses. No more than 4 practice electives may be counted toward the FMS major.

Internship program 
The internship program grants academic credit for internships in film, media and communications (FMS 99). One internship done for credit may be counted toward the FMS major or minor. Students can arrange to work at newspapers, magazines, film companies, advertising and public relations firms, television stations, radio stations, and publishing houses. Interns are required to work a minimum of 150 hours (approximately 12 to 15 hours each week), complete written requirements, and meet regularly with the faculty advisor.

Winternships 
The Film and Media Studies program at Tufts offers one week internships during winter break for students interested in getting experience in their desired media field. Internships are located in New York City, Los Angeles, Boston, Philadelphia, and Yakima, Washington. The internships are typically offered and early January, and require an application to be selected. All Tufts undergraduates are eligible to apply, though the application process is competitive.

Events 
The FMS program hosts numerous events for students to get more acquainted with careers in media-related fields.

Each fall semester, FMS and the Tufts Career Center jointly sponsor a "Media Internship Panel" featuring Tufts students who have completed various high-profile internships. The event provides other students with an opportunity to network with accomplished peers, who in turn offer advice on how to land a media internship.

FMS and the Tufts Career Center also collaborate on "Jobs in Media." This event features a panel of media professionals who are assembled to provide insight and tips for students on the media job market, along with interviewing and resume strategies, advice on what skills students should be mastering, and what it takes to land that first position after graduation. This event draws students from all across the university.

References

Tufts University